This table displays the top-rated primetime television series of the 1970–71 season as measured by Nielsen Media Research.

References

1970 in American television
1971 in American television
1970-related lists
1971-related lists
Lists of American television series